The Barber of Seville is an 1816 opera by Gioachino Rossini.

The Barber of Seville may also refer to:
The Barber of Seville (play), a 1773 French play by Pierre Beaumarchais
The Barber of Seville (Paisiello), a 1782 comic opera by Giovanni Paisiello
The Barber of Seville (1904 film), a French silent film
The Barber of Seville (1933 film), a French film directed by Hubert Bourlon and Jean Kemm
The Barber of Seville (1938 film), a German-Spanish musical film
The Barber of Seville (1944 film), a Woody Woodpecker cartoon
The Barber of Seville (1947 film), an Italian film
The Barber of Seville (1948 film), a French film
The Barber of Seville (1958 film), an Australian telefilm

See also
Adventures of the Barber of Seville, a 1954 film
The Ghosts of Versailles, a 1991 opera by John Corigliano
Rabbit of Seville, a 1950 Looney Tunes theatrical short